A pteridophyte is a vascular plant (with xylem and phloem) that disperses spores. Because pteridophytes produce neither flowers nor seeds, they are sometimes referred to as "cryptogams", meaning that their means of reproduction is hidden. Ferns, horsetails (often treated as ferns), and lycophytes (clubmosses, spikemosses, and quillworts) are all pteridophytes. However, they do not form a monophyletic group because ferns (and horsetails) are more closely related to seed plants than to lycophytes. "Pteridophyta" is thus no longer a widely accepted taxon, but the term pteridophyte remains in common parlance, as do pteridology and pteridologist as a science and its practitioner, respectively. Ferns and lycophytes share a life cycle and are often collectively treated or studied, for example by the International Association of Pteridologists and the Pteridophyte Phylogeny Group.

Description
Pteridophytes (ferns and lycophytes) are free-sporing vascular plants that have a life cycle with alternating, free-living gametophyte and sporophyte phases that are independent at maturity. The body of the sporophyte is well differentiated into roots, stem and leaves. The root systems is always adventitious. The stem is either underground or aerial. The leaves may be microphylls or megaphylls. Their other common characteristics include vascular plant apomorphies (e.g., vascular tissue) and land plant plesiomorphies (e.g., spore dispersal and the absence of seeds).

Taxonomy

Phylogeny 
Of the pteridophytes, ferns account for nearly 90% of the extant diversity. Smith et al. (2006), the first higher-level pteridophyte classification published in the molecular phylogenetic era, considered the ferns as monilophytes, as follows:
 Division Tracheophyta (tracheophytes) - vascular plants
 Subdivision Lycopodiophyta (lycophytes) - less than 1% of extant vascular plants
 Sub division Euphyllophytina (euphyllophytes)
 Infradivision Moniliformopses (monilophytes)
 Infradivision Spermatophyta - seed plants, ~260,000 species

where the monilophytes comprise about 9,000 species, including horsetails (Equisetaceae), whisk ferns (Psilotaceae), and all eusporangiate and all leptosporangiate ferns. Historically both lycophytes and monilophytes were grouped together as pteridophytes (ferns and fern allies) on the basis of being spore-bearing ("seed-free"). In Smith's molecular phylogenetic study the ferns are characterised by lateral root origin in the endodermis, usually mesarch protoxylem in shoots, a pseudoendospore, plasmodial tapetum, and sperm cells with 30-1000 flagella. The term "moniliform" as in Moniliformopses and monilophytes means "bead-shaped" and was introduced by Kenrick and Crane (1997) as a scientific replacement for "fern" (including Equisetaceae) and became established by Pryer et al. (2004). Christenhusz and Chase (2014) in their review of classification schemes provide a critique of this usage, which they discouraged as irrational. In fact the alternative name Filicopsida was already in use. By comparison "lycopod" or lycophyte (club moss) means wolf-plant. The term "fern ally" included under Pteridophyta generally refers to vascular spore-bearing plants that are not ferns, including lycopods, horsetails, whisk ferns and water ferns (Marsileaceae, Salviniaceae and Ceratopteris), and even a much wider range of taxa. This is not a natural grouping but rather a convenient term for non-fern, and is also discouraged, as is eusporangiate for non-leptosporangiate ferns.

However both Infradivision and Moniliformopses are also invalid names under the International Code of Botanical Nomenclature. Ferns, despite forming a monophyletic clade, are formally only considered as four classes (Psilotopsida; Equisetopsida; Marattiopsida; Polypodiopsida), 11 orders and 37 families, without assigning a higher taxonomic rank.

Furthermore, within the Polypodiopsida, the largest grouping, a number of informal clades were recognised, including leptosporangiates, core leptosporangiates, polypods (Polypodiales), and eupolypods (including Eupolypods I and Eupolypods II).

In 2014 Christenhusz and Chase, summarising the known knowledge at that time, treated this group as two separate unrelated taxa in a consensus classification;
 Lycopodiophyta (lycopods) 1 subclass, 3 orders, each with one family, 5 genera, approx. 1,300 species
 Polypodiophyta (ferns) 4 subclasses, 11 orders, 21 families, approx. 212 genera, approx. 10,535 species
 Subclass Equisetidae Warm.
 Subclass Ophioglossidae Klinge
 Subclass Marattiidae Klinge
 Subclass Polypodiidae Cronquist, Takht. & Zimmerm.
These subclasses correspond to Smith's four classes, with Ophioglossidae corresponding to Psilotopsida.

The two major groups previously included in Pteridophyta are phylogenetically related as follows:

Subdivision 

Pteridophytes consist of two separate but related classes, whose nomenclature has varied. The system put forward by the Pteridophyte Phylogeny Group in 2016, PPG I, is:

Class Lycopodiopsida Bartl. – lycophytes: clubmosses, quillworts and spikemosses; 3 extant orders
Order Lycopodiales DC. ex Bercht. & J.Presl – clubmosses; 1 extant family
Order Isoetales Prantl – quillworts; 1 extant family
Order Selaginellales Prantl – spikemosses; 1 extant family
Class Polypodiopsida Cronquist, Takht. & W.Zimm. – ferns; 11 extant orders
Subclass Equisetidae Warm. – horsetails; 1 extant order, family and genus (Equisetum)
Order Equisetales DC. ex Bercht. & J.Presl – 1 extant family
Subclass Ophioglossidae Klinge – 2 extant orders
Order Psilotales Prant – whisk ferns; 1 extant family
Order Ophioglossales Link – grape ferns; 1 extant family
Subclass Marattiidae Klinge –  marattioid ferns; 1 extant order
Order Marattiales Link – 1 extant family
Subclass Polypodiidae Cronquist, Takht. & W.Zimm. – leptosporangiate ferns; 7 extant orders
Order Osmundales Link – 1 extant family
Order Hymenophyllales A.B.Frank – 1 extant family
Order Gleicheniales Schimp – 3 extant families
Order Schizaeales Schimp. – 3 extant families
Order Salviniales Link – 2 extant families
Order Cyatheales A.B.Frank – 8 extant families
Order Polypodiales Link – 26 extant families

In addition to these living groups, several groups of pteridophytes are now extinct and known only from fossils. These groups include the Rhyniopsida, Zosterophyllopsida, Trimerophytopsida, the Lepidodendrales and the Progymnospermopsida.

Modern studies of the land plants agree that seed plants emerged from pteridophytes more closer to ferns than lycophytes. Therefore, pteridophytes do not form a clade but constitute a paraphyletic grade.

Lifecycle

Just as with bryophytes and spermatophytes (seed plants), the life cycle of pteridophytes involves alternation of generations. This means that a diploid generation (the sporophyte, which produces spores) is followed by a haploid generation (the gametophyte or prothallus, which produces gametes). Pteridophytes differ from bryophytes in that the sporophyte is branched and generally much larger and more conspicuous, and from seed plants in that both generations are independent and free-living. The sexuality of pteridophyte gametophytes can be classified as follows:

 Dioicous: each individual gametophyte is either male (producing antheridia and hence sperm) or female (producing archegonia and hence egg cells).
 Monoicous: each individual gametophyte produces both antheridia and archegonia and can function both as a male and as a female.
Protandrous: the antheridia mature before the archegonia (male first, then female).
Protogynous: the archegonia mature before the antheridia (female first, then male).

These terms are not the same as monoecious and dioecious, which refer to whether a seed plant's sporophyte bears both male and female gametophytes, i. e., produces both pollen and seeds, or just one of the sexes.

See also
 Embryophyte
 Fern ally
 Plant sexuality

References

Bibliography

External links 

 British Pteridological Society
 Annual Review of Pteridological Research 
 
Pteridophytes Test Questions for Papers And Quizzes [Important]

Cryptogams
Plants
Paraphyletic groups